Daniel Zabdiel Ramírez Carranza (born 21 December 1992) is a Mexican swimmer. He competed in the men's 100 metre freestyle event at the 2017 World Aquatics Championships.

References

1992 births
Living people
Mexican male swimmers
Place of birth missing (living people)
Swimmers at the 2019 Pan American Games
Pan American Games medalists in swimming
Pan American Games bronze medalists for Mexico
Central American and Caribbean Games medalists in swimming
Central American and Caribbean Games gold medalists for Mexico
Competitors at the 2018 Central American and Caribbean Games
Mexican male freestyle swimmers
Medalists at the 2019 Pan American Games
21st-century Mexican people